Charles Patrick McCartney  (26 February 1874 — 26 May 1949) was an Australian rules footballer who played with South Melbourne and Essendon in the Victorian Football League (VFL).

Family
The son of Francis McCartney (1840-1895), and Ann McCartney (1840-1898), née Ryan, Charles Patrick McCartney was born on 26 February 1874.

He married Alice Maud Felton (1877-1925) in 1904. He later married Jessie Wilhelmina Rachel Johnson (1866-1946), née Gail, in 1933.

Football
McCartney first played with West Melbourne in the junior competition and joined South Melbourne for the 1896 VFA season. He played for South Melbourne in its first VFL match, against Melbourne, at the Lake Oval, on 8 May 1897.

In 1898 he returned to West Melbourne, the team wearing crepe in the week following his mother's death.

In 1899 McCartney returned to the VFL, this time playing with Essendon.

Later life
McCartney worked for the International Harvester Company for nearly fifty years, retiring in 1940.

Death
Charles Patrick McCartney died at Colac on 26 May 1949.

Notes

References
 
 Maplestone, M., Flying Higher: History of the Essendon Football Club 1872–1996, Essendon Football Club, (Melbourne), 1996. 
 Essendon Football Team, Melbourne Punch, (Thursday, 1 June 1899), p.21—note that McCartney is identified as "M'Carty".

External links 
 		
 

1874 births
Year of death missing
Australian rules footballers from Melbourne
Sydney Swans players
Essendon Football Club players
People from West Melbourne, Victoria